Stephen A. Humphrey is an American politician and a former Republican member of the Colorado House of Representatives. He represented District 48 from January 9, 2013, to January 13, 2021.

Education and political career 
Humphrey earned his master's degree in clinical psychology from Pepperdine University.

In the aftermath of the 2020 presidential election, on December 7, 2020, Humphrey and 7 other Republicans demanded to the Speaker of the House KC Becker that a committee be formed on "election integrity" to conduct an audit of the Dominion Voting Systems used in Colorado's 2020 elections in spite of no evidence of issues. The request was rejected, with Becker criticizing it as a promotion of "debunked conspiracy theories."

Elections
2012 When District 48 incumbent Republican Representative Glenn Vaad ran for Colorado Senate, Humphrey ran in the June 26, 2012 Republican Primary, winning with 3,920 votes (56.9%); and won the November 6, 2012 General election with 25,779 votes (74.4%) against Democratic nominee John Gibson.

References

External links
Official page at the Colorado General Assembly
Campaign site
 

Place of birth missing (living people)
Year of birth missing (living people)
Living people
Republican Party members of the Colorado House of Representatives
People from Weld County, Colorado
Pepperdine University alumni
21st-century American politicians